In mathematics, specifically in order theory and functional analysis, the order bound dual of an ordered vector space  is the set of all linear functionals on  that map order intervals, which are sets of the form  to bounded sets. 

Canonical ordering 

If  is an ordered vector space whose positive cone  is generating (meaning ) then the order bound dual with the canonical ordering is an ordered vector space.

Properties 

The order bound dual of an ordered vector spaces contains its order dual. 
If the positive cone of an ordered vector space  is generating and if for all positive  and  we have  then the order dual is equal to the order bound dual, which is an order complete vector lattice under its canonical ordering.

Then for all 
 
 
 
 

See also

References

  
  

Functional analysis